Poortugaal is a village that is situated near the municipality of Rotterdam. Together with Rhoon, Poortugaal forms the municipality of Albrandswaard. The village has a long history dating back to the 15th century. It has a church dating from that period. The name is probably derived from Portugal. 

Since January 1, 1985, the village has been part of the municipality of Albrandswaard together with Rhoon.

The village has a connection to the city of Rotterdam by Rotterdam Metro line D, through Poortugaal station.

References

Albrandswaard
Populated places in South Holland
Former municipalities of South Holland